Lagafater is a 7000-acre (2832.8 ha) former sporting estate near New Luce in Dumfries and Galloway, Scotland. Since 1910 it has been in the family of its present owner, Sir Nicholas Spicer, Bt.

History 
Originally in the hands of the Earl of Cassillis, lands including Lagafater were gifted to Thomas Kennedy of Bargany in 1541 and 1550. The estate remained in the wider Kennedy family before being sold in 1822 to the Trustees of John, Earl of Stair. From there, it was sold to Robert Stewart of Corfin in 1847, to Sir George de la Poer Beresford in 1859, to the noted solicitor William White Millar SSC in 1863 and finally to the British Linen Company in 1887.

In 1894, White Millar re-purchased the Estate, and united it with the Dalnigap Estate which he had previously purchased in 1892. White Millar was subsequently imprisoned for embezzlement, and the estate was sold in 1910 to Cedric Randall Boult, father of the internationally noted conductor, Sir Adrian Boult. Sir Adrian's musical commitments were such that he could not visit often, and the estate was inherited by his sister, Olive I E Boult, before passing to her step-great-nephew, Sir Nicholas Spicer Bt.

The Houses 

The principal dwelling is Lagafater Lodge, a large Edwardian hunting lodge. The estate crofts and cottages have comprised Lagafater Cottage, Strabracken (ruined), Barnvannoch and Shennas (now sold). Dalnigap House, originally the principal dwelling for the Dalnigap Estate, is now also in private hands.

The earliest habitations, however, are evidenced by the ancient Hut Circles that lie 800m south of Lagafater Lodge. These were recognized by the Royal Commission on the Ancient and Historical Monuments of Scotland (RCAHMS) in 1981.

The Estate 
Originally a large heather moorland, the best preserved areas can be found in the Black Glen, to the north of the estate. The high point, Beneraird (439m) affords a view over four kingdoms (England, Scotland, Man, and Northern Ireland). In addition, there are several large coniferous plantations throughout the estate.

Alongside the Main Water of Luce, a category 3 Salmon River, the estate is home to many burns: Laggie, Scraby Lane, Lagganbeastie, Drummanmoan Loan, Pinwherran and the Loan of Turchloy. There are a number of dramatic falls, notably at Whisky and Dungeon Glens and at Loups of Dalnigap.

A large part of the estate falls within the Glenapp and Galloway Moors Site of Special Scientific Interest (SSSI).

References

Lagafater Estate
Archaeological sites in Dumfries and Galloway
Sites of Special Scientific Interest in Dumfries and Galloway